This is a list of replicas of Michelangelo's 1498–1499 statue, Pietà.

Asia 

 St. Mary's Cathedral, Tokyo, Tokyo, Japan
 St. Antony's Church, Kollam, Kerala, India
 St. Joseph's Catholic Church, Meenkunnam, Kerala, India
 St. John's Church, Seongnam, South Korea
 Minor Basilica of the Immaculate Conception Manila Metropolitan Cathedral, Manila, Philippines
 Our Lady of Remedies Parish Malate, Manila, Philippines
 Our Lady of Atonement Cathedral, Baguio City, Philippines
 Loyola Memorial Park Parañaque City, Philippines
 Our Lady of Sorrows Parish, Pasay, Philippines
 La Verna, Bandar Lampung, Indonesia
 Cathedral of the Good Shepherd, Singapore
 St Laurensius, Alam Sutera, Tangerang Selatan – Banten, Indonesia

Australasia 

 St Mary's Cathedral, Sydney, Australia

Europe 
  in Hoorn, Netherlands
 H.H. Simon en Judaskerk in Lattrop, Netherlands
 Church of Our Lady of Sorrows, Poznań, Poland
 University Church of the Blessed Name of Jesus, Wrocław, Poland
 Petworth House, Petworth, United Kingdom
Guadix Cathedral, Granada, Spain. 
 Madre del Buon Consiglio, Naples, Italy.
 Cathedral of SS Patrick & Colman, Newry. 
 Another one is in one of Romania' s Churches in Transylvania: Alba Iulia Church

North America
 St. Monica Catholic Church, Mishawaka, IN
 The Slater Memorial Museum, Norwich Free Academy, Norwich, CT. Full-sized cast-plaster copy of the original sculpture.
 Basilica of Sainte-Anne-de-Beaupré Quebec City, Canada

 Soumaya Museum, Mexico City, Mexico
 Cathedral of Our Lady of Refuge, Matamoros, Mexico
 Sacred Heart of Jesus Catholic Church, Anniston, Alabama
 St Anne Roman Catholic Parish, Gilbert, Arizona
 Cathedral of St. Andrew (Little Rock, Arkansas), Little Rock, Arkansas
 Cathedral of Christ the Light, Oakland, California
 Hotel Mission De Oro, Santa Nella, California
 Mother of Christ Catholic Church, Miami, Florida
 Saint Benedict Catholic Church, Honaunau, Hawaii
 St. Malachi Parish, Cleveland, Ohio
 Cathedral Basilica of St. Peter in Chains, Cincinnati, Ohio
 Our Lady of Sorrows Basilica, Chicago, Illinois – carved in Pietrasanta Italy by Spartaco Palla.
 Alexander Memorial Park Cemetery, Evansville, Indiana.  The full-sized marble statue is located inside The Chapel Of Remembrance mausoleum.
  St. Patrick's Catholic Church, Imogene, Iowa
 St. Angus Catholic Church, Pouch Cove, Newfoundland, Canada
 Cathedral of the Immaculate Conception, Wichita, Kansas
 St. Pius X Catholic Church, Lafayette, Louisiana.  2014 Arte Divine-Vatican Conservatory Foundation, No. 39 of 100, Medium – Cast Marble, Life Size.  Donated by the Stuller Family.
 Holy Family Catholic Church, Concord, Massachusetts
 Holy Family Catholic Church in Saginaw, Michigan
 St. Mary's Parish, Spring Lake, Michigan
 Cathedral of Saint Paul, National Shrine of the Apostle Paul, Saint Paul, Minnesota
 Cathedral Basilica of Saint Louis, Missouri
 Our Mother of Sorrows Cemetery, Reno Nevada. The statue is located at the main entrance to the cemetery
 St. Thomas Aquinas Cathedral, Reno, Nevada (This copy is approved by the Vatican according to the Church bulletin)      
 St. Patrick's Cathedral, New York City
 Queens Museum, Queens, New York
Wilhelm's Portland Memorial Funeral Home, Portland, Oregon
Resurrection Catholic Parish, Tualatin, Oregon
 The Church of Saint Joseph, Jim Thorpe, Pennsylvania
 St. Alexander Roman Catholic Church, Warren, Rhode Island
 Hamilton Memorial Gardens, Chapel of Devotion, Hixson, Tennessee
 St. Anne's Catholic Church, Beaumont, Texas
 St. Jude Catholic Church, Mansfield, Texas
 Socorro Mission – La Purisima Catholic Church, Socorro, Texas
 Christ United Methodist Church, Salt Lake City, Utah
 St. Mary of the Lakes Parish, Lakewood, Wisconsin
 Italian Community Center of Milwaukee, Milwaukee, Wisconsin
 Mission San Buenaventura, Ventura, California. 2018 Arte Divine-Vatican Conservatory Foundation, No. 73/100, Medium-Cast Marble, Life Size.
Dixie State University's Dolores Dore Eccles Fine Arts Center, St. George, Utah. #14/100
St. Viator Catholic Church, Old Irving Park, Chicago, Illinois
St. Thomas More Catholic Parish, Centennial, Colorado
 The Academy of Our Lady of Peace, San Diego, California. An exact 1:1 cast from the original sculpture.

South America 

 The Metropolitan Cathedral of Brasília, Brasilia, Brazil.
 The Church of Nossa Senhora da Conceição, Urussanga, Santa Catarina, Brazil.
 The Church of São Pelegrino, Caxias do Sul, Brazil
 The Church of Santiago Apostol Lampa, Puno, Peru
 Entrance of Cemetery One, Valparaíso, Chile

See also
 List of statues of Jesus

References

External links

Sculptures of the Pietà
Pieta